The Solar Platform of Almería (PSA) is the largest concentrating solar technology research, development and test centre in Europe, situated in the Province of Almería, Spain in Tabernas.

History
The PSA was founded in 1981 by IEA – International Energy Agency. But since 1987 it belongs to Spain through the Centro de Investigaciones Energéticas, Medioambientales y Tecnológicas (CIEMAT), a public research organization of the Government of Spain. PSA is European Large Installation Facility since 1990 and belongs to the selected group (created in 2014) of Spanish singular scientific and technical infrastructures (ICTS in its Spanish acronym).

Testing
Over 20,000 m² of mirrors are installed on a  site. There are several techniques tested under practical conditions, mainly solar thermal power plants. Hydrosol-2 is a solar power tower and a set of heliostats to collect the solar thermal energy.

About 

 Facility belongs to CIEMAT, a public research organization under the Spanish Ministry of Economy and Competitiveness (MINECO).
 R&D activities focus on potential industrial applications of concentrating solar thermal energy and solar photochemistry. 
 Built on a plot of 103 hectares located in Tabernas (Almería).
 About 120 staff, of which 40% are researchers.

Milestones 

1975	 The International Energy Agency (IEA) decided to design and build a facility in one location to validate the solar thermal technology potential for the production of electricity.
1976	 A work group in the IEA proposed the development of two 500 kW thermosolar power plants (CRS y DCS) within the SSPS project.
1977	 Spain through the Centro de Estudios de la Energía (CEE) started a study on a solar power plant of tower type of 1,2 MWe (Project CESA 1)
1978	 The work of Basic Engineering for project CESA-1 started and it was decided to install the solar project in Tabernas, Almería.
1979	 Begin of civil work for the construction of PSA
1981	 Official inauguration of CRS and DCS plants of the Project SSPS
1983     Inauguration of the CESA-1 plant
1985	 SSPS project finished and the activity undertaken here was replaced by SolarPACES activity that remains ongoing today
1986	 Unification of the various facilities in the PSA, which was taken over by the Institute of Renewable Energy of CIEMAT.
1987	 Signing of the Hispano-German Agreement with DLR for the co management of PSA
1990	 Recognition as 'Large European Science Facility'
1998	 The management of PSA is no longer based on the Hispano-German Agreement and the responsibility of the PSA is entirely Spanish
2005	 The PSA is fully integrated into the CIEMAT structure, being a division of the Department of Energy

Research 

Research activity at the Plataforma Solar de Almería has been structured around three R&D Units: 
 Solar Concentrating Systems Unit.
 Solar Desalination Unit.
 Solar Treatment of Water Unit.

Test Facilities 

CESA-1 and SSPS-CRS central receiver systems, 5 and 2.5 MWth respectively.
TCP-100 2.3-MWth parabolic-trough collector field with associated 115-m3 thermal oil storage system.
DISS 2.5-MWth test loop, an excellent experimental system for two-phase flow and direct steam generation with parabolic trough collectors in different working conditions, up to 500 °C and 100bar.
The FRESDEMO “linear Fresnel” technology loop.
Pressurized gas cooled parabolic-trough collectors system coupled to two-tank molten salts thermal energy storage facility.
A parabolic-trough collector test facility with thermal oil (the HTF-PTC Test loop) for qualification of solar components.
A rotary test bench for parabolic trough collectors, named KONTAS.
4-unit dish/Stirling facility, named DISTAL, and 2 EuroDish units.
A group of 3 solar furnaces, two of them with horizontal axis 60 kWth and 40 kWth, and a third one with vertical axis 5 kWth.
A test stand for small evaluation and qualification of parabolic trough collectors, named CAPSOL.
A 14-stage multi-effect distillation (MED) plant.
A multiple solar detoxification and disinfection application facilities.
The ARFRISOL building, an energy research demonstrator office building prototypes.
A meteorological station integrated in the ‘Baseline Surface Radiation Network’.

See also
List of solar thermal power stations
Solar power in Spain

References 

La electricidad termosolar, historia de éxito de la investigación. Protermosolar, Sevilla, 2012. 
Plataforma Solar de Almeria. Annual Report 2012. NIPO 721-13-016-4.
Annual Technical Report 1994, Plataforma Solar de Almeria. .
Tecnología Energéticas e Impacto Ambiental. Macgraw-Hill/Interamericana, 2001.

External links
  
 Impressions Plataforma Solar de Almería

Solar power in Spain
Buildings and structures in the Province of Almería
Organizations established in 1981
1981 establishments in Spain